The W. P. Hackney House, located at 417 E. 10th St. in Winfield, Kansas, was built in 1886.  Also known as the Jarvis House, it was listed on the National Register of Historic Places in 1973.

Completed in 1886, the three-story limestone house is an example of Vernacular architecture. It was home to W. P. Hackney, a prominent lawyer and politician.

References

Houses on the National Register of Historic Places in Kansas
Houses completed in 1886
Cowley County, Kansas